George Thabe Stadium is a multi-use stadium in Sharpeville, Gauteng, South Africa. It is currently used mostly for football matches and is the home venue of Real Barcelona F.C. in the SAFA Second Division.

References

Sports venues in Gauteng
Soccer venues in South Africa
Sharpeville